In enzymology, a serine 3-dehydrogenase is an enzyme that catalyzes the chemical reaction

L-serine + NADP+  2-ammoniomalonate semialdehyde + NADPH + H+

Thus, the two substrates of this enzyme are L-serine and NADP+, whereas its 3 products are 2-ammoniomalonate semialdehyde, NADPH, and H+.

This enzyme belongs to the family of oxidoreductases, specifically those acting on the CH-OH group of donor with NAD+ or NADP+ as acceptor. The systematic name of this enzyme class is L-serine:NADP+ 3-oxidoreductase.

References

 
 

EC 1.1.1
NADPH-dependent enzymes
Enzymes of unknown structure